Carondelet High School is an all-girls private Catholic high school in Concord, California, United States. Carondelet High School was founded in 1965 by the Sisters of Saint Joseph. The school enrolls about 800 students. It shares some resources with the all-boys De La Salle High School, which is across a side-street that separates them. De La Salle High School was founded by the Christian Brothers. Students in their junior and senior years are able to take classes at the other school for four of the school's six class periods, and also as lowerclassmen for language and art. The school is located within the Diocese of Oakland.

History 
Carondelet was founded in 1965, by the Sisters of Saint Joseph of Carondelet.  as suggested by the first Bishop of Oakland, California, Bishop Floyd Begin of Oakland. At that time, Carondelet was the only Catholic high school for girls in Contra Costa County.
It opened in September 1965, consisting of only six classrooms and six teachers, three sisters and three lay women. The freshman class was of only 115 young women.

The school was completed on October 22, 1966, and was dedicated to Bishop Floyd Begin.

In September 1969, Carondelet established a cooperative academic program with De La Salle High School, the all-boys Roman Catholic campus located across the street. Thus, Carondelet expanded their academics by allowing juniors and seniors from both schools to attend selected classes from either campus.

Notable alumni
 Jayne Appel, Class of 2006, Stanford basketball team, WNBA San Antonio Silver Stars County 
 Natalie Coughlin, Class of 2000, Olympic swimming champion and 12-time medalist
 Nancy O'Malley Class of 1971, District Attorney of Alameda County 
 Tiffany Roberts, Class of 1995, U.S. women's soccer team  
 Rosanne Siino, Class of 1980, retired vice president of communications for Netscape Communications Corporation, consultant; teacher at Stanford University, former Director of Communication and teacher at Carondelet High School 
 Marcie Ward, Class of 2000, soccer player

References

External links
 Carondelet High School website
 De La Salle High School

Girls' schools in California
Catholic secondary schools in California
Educational institutions established in 1965
Roman Catholic Diocese of Oakland
Congregation of the Sisters of Saint Joseph
High schools in Contra Costa County, California
1965 establishments in California